The following are timelines of modern history, from the end of the Middle Ages, to the present.

General timelines

Early modern period
For a timeline of events prior to 1501, see 
For a timeline of events from 1501 to 1600, see 
For a timeline of events from 1601 to 1700, see Timeline of the 17th century
For a timeline of events from 1701 to 1800, see Timeline of the 18th century

Late modern period
For a timeline of events from 1801 to 1900, see Timeline of the 19th century
For a timeline of events from 1901 to 1945, see Timeline of the 20th century
 For 1914–1918, see Timeline of World War I
 For 1939–1945 see Timeline of World War II

Contemporary period
For a timeline of events from 1945 to 2000, see 
 Timeline of events in the Cold War
For a timeline of events from 2001 onward, see Timeline of the 21st century

Nations
 Timeline of Australian history
 Timeline of British history
 Timeline of British diplomatic history
 Timeline of Canadian history
 Timeline of Chinese history
 Timeline of Cuban history
 Timeline of French history
 Timeline of German history
 Timeline of Greek history
 Timeline of Indian history
 Timeline of Italian history
 Timeline of Japanese history
 Timeline of Mexican history
 Timeline of Polish history
 Timeline of Palestinian history
 Timeline of Portuguese history
 Timeline of Russian history
 Timeline of Spanish history
 Timeline of Turkish history
 Timeline of United States history

Topical timelines
List of years in literature
Timeline of geopolitical changes (1900–1999)
Timeline of geopolitical changes (2000–present)
List of firsts in aviation

Exploration
Timeline of European exploration
List of circumnavigations
List of Arctic expeditions
Timeline of Solar System exploration

Wars
List of wars: 1500–1799
List of wars: 1800–1899
List of wars: 1900–1944
List of wars: 1945–1989
List of wars: 1990–2002
List of wars: 2003–present

See also
 List of timelines

References

Further reading
 Langer, William. An Encyclopedia of World History (5th ed. 1973); highly detailed outline of events online free
 Morris, Richard B. and Graham W. Irwin, eds. Harper Encyclopedia of the Modern World: A Concise Reference History from 1760 to the Present (1970) online

 

Modern